The Christian Science Center is a  site on the corner of Massachusetts Avenue and Huntington Avenue in the Fenway neighborhood of Boston, Massachusetts. A popular tourist attraction, the center is owned by the Church of Christ, Scientist (the Christian Science church), which refers to it as Christian Science Plaza. The complex, including most of the landscape was designated as a Boston Landmark by the Boston Landmarks Commission in 2011.

The site houses the religion's administrative center and its Mother Church, The First Church of Christ, Scientist.

Buildings
The Christian Science Center comprises  of open space, a 690 x 100 ft (210 x 30 m) reflecting pool, a children's fountain, and six buildings:

The First Church of Christ, Scientist, 250 Massachusetts Avenue, consisting of two buildings: the original Mother Church (1894) and the Church Extension (1906).
Christian Science Publishing House (1934), 200–210 Massachusetts Avenue, built for the Christian Science Publishing Society, and now also housing the Mary Baker Eddy Library, Mapparium, The Christian Science Monitor and the church's administrative staff.
Three buildings, designed by Araldo Cossutta of I. M. Pei & Associates,  constructed when the site was extended in the 1970s:
Reflection Hall, the former Sunday School building (1971), 235 Huntington Avenue, at one end of the reflecting pool.
The Colonnade building (1972), 101 Belvidere Street.
177 Huntington, formerly the Administration Building (1972). This 26-story building housed the church's administrative staff until 2008, when they moved to Christian Science Publishing House. The building is now leased out as office space.

Gallery

See also
Belvidere/Dalton Tower

References

External links

1890s architecture in the United States
1900s architecture in the United States
1930s architecture in the United States
1970s architecture in the United States
Christian Science in Massachusetts
Landmarks in Fenway–Kenmore
Religious buildings and structures in Boston